Kromskoy (masculine), Kromskaya (feminine), or Kromskoye (neuter) is the name of several rural localities in Russia:
Kromskoy (rural locality), a settlement in Bolshekolchevsky Selsoviet of Kromskoy District of Oryol Oblast
Kromskaya, Kursk Oblast, a village in Kromskoy Selsoviet of Fatezhsky District of Kursk Oblast
Kromskaya, Oryol Oblast, a village in Topkovsky Selsoviet of Pokrovsky District of Oryol Oblast